Nà Phặc is a township (Thị trấn) of Ngân Sơn District, Bắc Kạn Province, in Vietnam. However, it is not the district capital. Instead, the district capital lies at Vân Tùng commune.

Populated places in Bắc Kạn province
Communes of Bắc Kạn province
Townships in Vietnam